The 111th Division was created in February 1950 under the Regulation of the Redesignations of All Organizations and Units of the Army, issued by Central Military Commission on November 1, 1948,basing on the 319th Division, 2nd Security Brigade and 5th Security Regiment of Republic of China Army defected on September 19, 1949 during the Chinese Civil War.

The division was part of 37th Corps.

In April 1951 personnel and equipment of the division were absorbed by 106th Division, and the 111th became a cadre division.

In February 1952 the division was disbanded.

References

Infantry divisions of the People's Liberation Army
Military units and formations established in 1950
Military units and formations disestablished in 1952